Guilerme Kennedy Romão (born 7 October 1997) is a Brazilian footballer who plays for CRB as a left-back.

Club career
Born in Marília, São Paulo, Romão joined Corinthians' youth setup in 2015, from hometown club Marília. On 28 April 2017, he renewed his contract until 2020.

On 22 May 2017, Romão was loaned to Série B club Oeste until the end of the season. He made his professional debut four days later, coming on as a half-time substitute for Daniel Borges in a 1–1 away draw against Boa Esporte.

Romão finished the campaign with 23 appearances, as his side narrowly missed out promotion; he subsequently returned to his parent club, being included in the first team squad.

Career statistics

Honours
Corinthians
Campeonato Paulista: 2018

References

External links
 

1997 births
Living people
People from Marília
Brazilian footballers
Association football defenders
Footballers from São Paulo (state)
Campeonato Brasileiro Série B players
Marília Atlético Clube players
Sport Club Corinthians Paulista players
Oeste Futebol Clube players
Esporte Clube São Bento players
Botafogo Futebol Clube (SP) players
Clube de Regatas Brasil players